John Garrity is an officer in the United States Army.
In 2009 he was appointed the camp commandant of the Bagram Theater Internment Facility.  Task Force Lone Star from Texas served as the operational command unit that COL Garrity used to maintain custody, control and care of over 2,ooo enemy combatants.  SFC Bryan Bradley from the Texas Army National Guard and Chief Matthew Lacy from the United States Navy served as the Guard Force Commanders under COL Garrity.
COL Garrity oversaw the closing of the old temporary facility built in a ruined hangar from the era of Afghanistan's Soviet occupation—that had nevertheless been in use since early 2002—and the opening of modern facilities.
Prior to serving as camp commandant at Bagram he commanded the 16th Military Police Brigade (Airborne) at Fort Bragg.

According to Saeed Shah, of the McClatchy News Service, Garrity was tasked to reverse Bagram's bad reputation.

Under his leadership, the Bagram Theater Internment Facility was closed and the Detention Facility in Parwan was opened.  The Detention Facility in Parwan became a focal point in the reintegration of former Taliban Fighters back into Afghan society as healthy men, educated with a trade and motivated to care for their Family and village.

Garrity has since retired from the U.S. Military.

References

United States Army officers
Living people
Year of birth missing (living people)